Stilbosis turrifera is a moth in the family Cosmopterigidae. It was described by Edward Meyrick in 1921. It was described from Simla.

References

Moths described in 1921
Chrysopeleiinae
Moths of Asia